The women's 100 metre freestyle competition of the swimming events at the 1987 Pan American Games took place on 9 August at the Indiana University Natatorium. The last Pan American Games champion was Carrie Steinseifer of US.

This race consisted of two lengths of the pool, both lengths being in freestyle.

Results
All times are in minutes and seconds.

Heats
The first round was held on August 9.

Final 
The final was held on August 9.

References

Swimming at the 1987 Pan American Games
Pan